The Women's triple jump event  at the 2004 IAAF World Indoor Championships was held on March 5–6.

Medalists

Results

Qualification
Qualifying performance 14.30 (Q) or 8 best performers (q) advanced to the final.

Final

References
Results

Triple
Triple jump at the World Athletics Indoor Championships
2004 in women's athletics